Mitrovica, which stems from the name "Saint Demetrius" or "Sveti Dimitrije" (Cyrillic: "Свети Димитрије") may refer to:

Places 
 District of Mitrovica, a district in Kosovo
 Mitrovica, Kosovo, a city in the district above
 North Mitrovica, the northern part of the city above
 Sremska Mitrovica, a city and municipality in Srem, Vojvodina, Serbia
 Sremska Mitrovica prison
 Sremska Mitrovica Airport
 Mačvanska Mitrovica, a town in the municipality above

People with the surname 
 Rexhep Mitrovica (1888–1967), Albanian politician

See also  
 Kosovska Mitrovica District (Serbia), a district of Serbia in Kosovo between 1990 and 1999
 Mitrović
 Mitrovice (disambiguation)

sv:Mitrovica